Korean national anthem may refer to:

 "Aegukka", the national anthem of North Korea
 "Aegukga", the national anthem of South Korea
 National anthem of the Korean Empire 
 "Arirang", a Korean folk song that is often considered to be the anthem of Korea